Mamadou Lamine Diocou Soumare, (born 10 February 2000 in Fassada, Senegal) is a Spanish handball player, currently playing for FC Porto, on loan from FC Barcelona.
 
He moved to Spain when he was 9 years old, and played as a kid for Club Deportivo Iplacea. He then moved on to FC Barcelona's youth system, working his way up to joining the senior club team in 2018. In 2021 it was announced he is leaving on a loan to Rhein-Neckar Löwen for two years.

He has participated in the Spanish youth and junior national teams.

References

Spanish male handball players
FC Barcelona Handbol players
Rhein-Neckar Löwen players
2000 births
Living people
Senegalese emigrants to Spain